The Fimcap EuroCamp is an international social activity organized by the International Federation of Catholic Parochial Youth Movements (Fimcap). The EuroCamp is organized once a year and is each time hosted by another European member organization of Fimcap. The World Camp combines group leader education and thematic work with intercultural exchange.

History
List of former Fimcap EuroCamps Until 2008 the Fimcap EuroCamp was called EuroContact.

References

Christian summer camps
Fimcap
Catholic organizations established in the 21st century